Heiki Nabi (born 6 June 1985) is an Estonian Olympic champion Greco-Roman wrestler.

Nabi was born in Hilleste, Hiiumaa.  At the 2006 World Wrestling Championships he won the gold medal in the men's Greco-Roman (96 kg) category and became the first amateur wrestling World Champion for his home country, because previous Estonian wrestling World Champion August Englas (1953 and 1954) competed for Soviet Union. At the 2012 Summer Olympics in London, Nabi won the silver medal in the Men's Greco-Roman 120kg.

Achievements

External links

Heiki Nabi (Estonia) : results, statistics
Nabi, Heiki at Wrestling Database
Heiki Nabi Philatelic Postage Stamp and Card (Estonian)

1985 births
Living people
People from Hiiumaa Parish
Olympic medalists in wrestling
Olympic silver medalists for Estonia
Olympic wrestlers of Estonia
Wrestlers at the 2012 Summer Olympics
Wrestlers at the 2016 Summer Olympics
Medalists at the 2012 Summer Olympics
European Games bronze medalists for Estonia
European Games medalists in wrestling
Wrestlers at the 2015 European Games
World Wrestling Championships medalists
Estonian male sport wrestlers
Universiade medalists in wrestling
Universiade bronze medalists for Estonia
Recipients of the Order of the White Star, 2nd Class
Medalists at the 2005 Summer Universiade